Alty is a surname. Notable people with the surname include:

 James Alty (1939–2022), British computer scientist
 Thomas Alty (1899–1982), Scottish physicist and university administrator

See also
 Ally (name)
 Alti
 Altrincham